Parasi is a census town in Sonbhadra district in the Indian state of Uttar Pradesh.

Demographics
 India census, Parasi had a population of 21,203. Males constitute 56% of the population and females 44%. Parasi has an average literacy rate of 74%, higher than the national average of 59.5%: male literacy is 81%, and female literacy is 65%. In Parasi, 14% of the population is under 6 years of age.

References

Cities and towns in Sonbhadra district